On 21 December 2007, at least 50 people were killed and 100 others injured by a suicide bombing in Charsadda District, North-West Frontier Province, Pakistan. The bomber detonated his explosives in a mosque in the residential compound of Interior Minister Aftab Ahmad Khan Sherpao, where prayers for Eid al-Adha were being conducted. Sherpao was among the 1,000 people in the mosque at the time, but was not injured. The bomb contained around seven kilograms of explosive as well as nails and ball bearings.  

Charsadda suffered major insurgent attacks in April 2007, February 2008, May 2011, January 2016 and February 2017.

See also
 Terrorist incidents in Pakistan in 2007

References

2007 murders in Pakistan
21st-century mass murder in Pakistan
2007 mosque bombing
Mass murder in 2007
Suicide bombings in 2007
Suicide bombings in Khyber Pakhtunkhwa